Bu Jebrail (also Romanized as Bū Jebrā’īl; also known as Boojabra’il) is a village in Moqam Rural District, Shibkaveh District, Bandar Lengeh County, Hormozgan Province, in southern Iran. At the 2006 census, its population was 239, in 38 families.

References 

Populated places in Bandar Lengeh County